is the second greatest hits album by Japanese girl idol group Berryz Kobo. It was released on 26 February 2014 on the label Piccolo Town.

Release 
The album was released in 2 versions: a regular edition and a limited edition. The limited edition included an additional DVD.

The album contains 17 tracks on the CD: 15 tracks that had been released before and 2 new songs. The 15 previously released tracks are in reverse chronological order of release.

Chart performance 
The album debuted at number 26 in the Japanese Oricon weekly albums chart.

Personnel 
Members of Beryz Kobo:
 Saki Shimizu 
 Momoko Tsugunaga 
 Chinami Tokunaga 
 Miyabi Natsuyaki 
 Masa Sudo 
 Yurina Kumai 
 Risako Sugaya

Track listing

Charts

References

External links 
 Profile of the album on the official website of Up-Front Works

Berryz Kobo albums
2014 compilation albums
Piccolo Town albums
Japanese-language albums